Ostroh Academy was an academy located in Ostróg, Polish–Lithuanian Commonwealth. It is considered to be the first institution of higher education in the territory of present-day Ukraine, dating to 1576 and founded by Polish nobleman of Ruthenian descent Konstanty Wasyl Ostrogski. The university was closed in 1636 soon after opening the Jesuit College in Ostróg (Ostroh).

History

In the 16th century, all higher schools of the Polish–Lithuanian Commonwealth were under influence of the Catholic or Protestant nobles. To counter this influence, Count Konstanty Ostrogski, one of the most influential people in the Crown of Poland (and later a major partisan of the Orthodox faith against the Union of Brest), founded a large school in his estate in Ostroh in what is now Ukraine. Ostrogski envisioned a lay school, that would however strengthen the Eastern Christian spirit in the country and prevent conversions to Protestantism and Catholicism, a process in full swing at the time and as such was first mentioned in Piotr Skarga's 1577 On the Unity of God's Church under the Single Shepherd and on Greek Secession from this Unity.

The school was founded some time between 1576 and 1580, but it did not start full activities until 1585. Initially tasked only with translation of The Bible to Old Church Slavonic (later published as the Ostrog Bible), with time it grew to become a permanent institution of secondary education.

A large part of the funding came from Princess Halszka Ostrogska's testament of 1579, in which she donated "six times sixty thousand" (360,000) Lithuanian grosz to local school, hospital and Holy Spas' (i.e. Savior's) monastery near Łuck (Lutsk).

The school, officially styled Academy, was modelled after Western European education of the epoch. It taught the trivium (grammar, rhetorics, dialectics) as well as the quadrivium (arithmetics, geometry, music and astronomy). It featured education in Latin, Greek and Ruthenian (predecessor to both modern Ukrainian and Belarusian), the only institution of higher education in the world teaching that language at the time.

The first rector of the academy was Herasym Smotrycki, a noted Eastern Christian writer of the epoch. With time, Ostrogski assembled a significant group of professors, many of them having been expelled from the Jagiellonian University (such as the first dean of astronomy Jan Latosz) or having quarreled with the king or the Catholic clergy. However, the political nature of the conflict between Ostrogski, Protestants and Catholics prevented the school from attracting enough professors of international fame. It did however invite numerous Greek scientists from abroad, including Smotrycki's successor Kyrillos Lukaris, as well as Metropolitan bishop Kizikos, Nicefor Parasios, the envoy of the Metropolitan of Constantinople, and Emmanuel Achilleos, a religious writer. Some of the professors were also of local stock, including Jurij Rohatyniec, Wasyl Maluszycki and Jow Kniahicki. The religious character of the academy was underlined by close ties to Eastern Christian monasteries of Derman, Dubno, Slutsk and later also Pochayiv.

While the school failed to attract as many students as the founder had envisioned, it nevertheless became very influential as a centre of Ruthenian (that is Russian, Ukrainian, and Belarusian) culture and literature. Among the notable alumni were religious writer Zacharius Kopystensky, hetman Petro Konashevych-Sahaidachny, one of the fathers of Belarusian poetry Andrzej Rymsza and future exarchs of Lwów Gedeon Balaban and of Polotsk Meletius Smotrytsky, son of the first rector and a noted Orthodox writer and teacher. It also became the alma mater of professors of the so-called brotherhood schools for Orthodox burghers being founded in the late 16th century all around the country in accordance with the royal decree of 1585 by king Stefan Batory. After the death of Konstanty Wasyl Ostrogski in 1608 the Ostroh Academy declined, but then was revived by his son Janusz Ostrogski as a Jesuit College.

Notable dates
 June 18, 1578 – Ivan Fyodorov with help of teachers printed first book in Ukraine - Bukvar (Alphabet book) and “Greek-Rus' Church Slavonic Reader”, which mentions about establishment of the Ostroh Academy.
 March 9, 1579 – niece of duke Konstanty Ostrogski – princess Halszka Ostrogska confirms in testament her contribution for St. Spas Monastery, village Dorosyni and Ostroh Academy of amount of 6 000 "cop money" in lithuenian count. This was first contribution for Academy.
1580 – with assistance of teachers Ivan Fyodorov printed first in Ukraine printed “Book of New Testament”, Tymophy Mykhailovych's “Книжка събраніе вещей нужнеѣйших вкъратцѣ скораго ради обрѣтенія в Книзе Новаго Завѣта” and first edition of science literature.
May 5, 1581 – was printed first religious poetic calendar “Которого ся мѣсяца што за старых вѣков дѣло коротко е описаніе”, known in modern science literature as Andrew Rymshi's “Chronology”.
July 12, 1581 – was printed "Ostrog Bible", with effort of Ivan Fyodorov and leaders of Academy this was first full printing of Eastern Orthodox's Old Testament.

Notable alumni
 Petro Konashevych-Sahaidachny (1570 - March 20, 1622) — Ukrainian szlachta, Hetman of Ukraine (1614 – 1622).
 Ostroh Сleric — pseudonym of Ukrainian unknown writer-polemnist (end of 16th - beginning of 17th century).
 Meletius Smotrytsky (1577 - December 17(27), 1633) — Ukrainian linguist from Galicia, author and religious activist.
 Andrew Rymsha — Ukrainian writer and translator at the end of 16th century.

Closure of Ostroh Academy 
The closure of the Academy was connected with the Catholicization of the descendants Konstanty Wasyl Ostrogski and the activities of the Jesuits. The Academy was liquidated by the old prince's granddaughter, Nadia's daughter and Oleksander Ostrogski — Anna Alojza Ostrogska (married Chodkiewicz). She materially limits the activity of the Academy, tries to reduce it to the level of a parochial school, creates and materially provides  in Ostroh (1624)

On the Easter night of 1636, Hanni-Aloise managed to finally liquidate the remnants of the Academy, introduce a union in Ostrog and other estates, provoking a demonstration by the inmates. Thus, 1636 is considered the last year of the Ostroh Academy's existence.

See also
 National University Ostroh Academy

References 

1576 establishments in the Polish–Lithuanian Commonwealth
Educational institutions established in the 1570s
Universities and colleges in the Polish–Lithuanian Commonwealth
1636 disestablishments in Europe